Kevin Mor McCrimmon (born September 1941) is an American mathematician, specializing in Jordan algebras. He is known for his introduction of quadratic Jordan algebras in 1966.

McCrimmon attended secondary school in Champaign-Urbana, Illinois and then received his bachelor's degree in mathematics in 1960 from Reed College in Portland, Oregon. He received his Ph.D. from Yale University in 1965 with thesis Norms and Noncommutative Jordan Algebras supervised by Nathan Jacobson. McCrimmon spent his final year as a graduate student at the University of Chicago, when Nathan Jacobson spent a year of unpaid leave visiting Chicago and Japan for the academic year 1964–1965. As a postdoc, McCrimmon was at Massachusetts Institute of Technology from 1965 to 1967, for one year as an Air Force Research Laboratory Postdoctoral Fellow and for the next year as a C. L. E. Moore instructor. He became in 1967 a member of the Center for Advanced Studies at the University of Virginia (UVA), in 1968 an associate professor at UVA, and in 1972, a full professor at UVA, retiring there as professor emeritus. He was chair of the mathematics department from 1972 to 1975.

McCrimmon was a Sloan Fellow in 1968 and an Invited Speaker of the International Congress of Mathematicians in 1974 in Vancouver. He spent several years on sabbatical in Europe. He was elected a Fellow of the American Mathematical Society in 2017.

Selected publications
with Richard D. Schafer: 
 
 
 
 
 
 
 
with Leslie Hogben: 
with Ephim Zel'manov:

References

1941 births
Living people
20th-century American mathematicians
21st-century American mathematicians
Reed College alumni
Yale University alumni
University of Virginia faculty
Sloan Research Fellows
Fellows of the American Mathematical Society
Massachusetts Institute of Technology School of Science faculty